Odd Reinsfelt (23 August 1941 – 16 August 2022) was a Norwegian politician for the Conservative Party and meteorologist.

Before Reinsfelt became a full-time politician he was Chief Meteorologist at NATO's Norwegian department.

Reinsfelt entered the municipal council of Bærum after the 1975 election. He became mayor of Bærum in 1992, having served as deputy mayor since 1980. He retired in 2011.

Reinsfelt died on 16 August 2022, at the age of 80, a week before turning 81.

References 

1941 births
2022 deaths
Norwegian meteorologists
Bærum politicians
Conservative Party (Norway) politicians
Mayors of places in Akershus